Karjala is a Finnish lager-type beer manufactured by the Hartwall brewery.

Karjala may also refer to:
 Karjala (municipality), a former Finnish municipality in Southwest Finland
 Karelia (Karjala in Finnish and Estonian), an area in Northern Europe
 Karjala (historical province of Finland), partly ceded to Russia in 1940
 Republic of Karelia, a federal subject of Russia
 Finnish gunboat Karjala, a Filin-class guard ship
 Finnish corvette Karjala, a Turunmaa-class gunboat

People with the surname
 Dennis Karjala (1939–2017), American law professor